All Around the Town is a 1948 picture book written by Phyllis McGinley and illustrated by Helen Stone. The book is a rhyming alphabet book exploring a town. The book was a recipient of a 1949 Caldecott Honor for its illustrations.

References

1948 children's books
American picture books
Caldecott Honor-winning works
J. B. Lippincott & Co. books